Gayatri Das (born 8 June 1981) known professionally as Geetu Mohandas is an Indian film actress and director known for her works in Malayalam cinema and Bollywood. In 2013, she directed the socio political film Liar's Dice which has received two National Film Awards, was premiered at Sundance Film Festival, and was chosen by the Government of India as India's entry for the U.S. 87th Academy Awards, popularly known as the Oscars, but was not shortlisted or nominated.

Career

As an actress

Geetu's actual name is Gayatri das. Affectionately called Geetu by her family, the name was adopted as her screen name when she starred in her fourth movie Onnu Muthal Poojyam Vare in 1986 with Mohanlal in the lead role. Geetu was five years old then and captured the hearts of Malayalam filmgoers as a fatherless child who discovers a father in an anonymous telephone caller. She acted in the top grosser En Bommukutty Ammavukku as the title role, which was the Tamil remake of Fazil's Ente Mamattikkuttiyammakku (Malayalam) done by Baby Shalini in the title role. Geetu's first movie as an adult was Life is Beautiful starring Mohanlal in the lead. She went on to act in Thenkasi Pattanam, Valkannadi, Nammal Thammil and several other Malayalam movies. The high point of her career was Akale directed by Shyamaprasad, and produced by Tom George Kolath which won her the Kerala State Award for Best Actress in 2004. Geetu also won the Filmfare Award for Best Actress – Malayalam, for her role as Rose, in Akale.

As director
Geetu Mohandas formed her film production house- Unplugged in 2009 which produced her directorial debut short fiction film titled Kelkkunnundo Are you listening. The film premiered at the International Film Festival Rotterdam and subsequently won 3 International awards for Best Short fiction as well as the National Film Award in India. The film has been included as a chapter in the 12th standard Kerala state syllabus since 2014. Her first feature film Liar's Dice (film) received the Hubert Bals fund for script and project development and the film was selected in Competition for the world dramatic competition at Sundance Film Festival  in 2014. Liar's Dice (film) went on to win six major international awards across the world and two National awards in India. It was also India's official entry for the Best Foreign Film category for the 87th Academy Awards. Her second feature film, Moothon was mentored by the Sundance film lab and Geetu also won the Global film maker award  at Sundance Film Festival in 2016. Moothon had its World premiere at Toronto International film festival in 2019 and was the opening film at MAMI 2019.

Personal life
She was born as Gayatri Das to Mohandas and Latha on June 8, 1981 at Kochi. Studied in India, Malaysia and Canada. She has a brother, Dr. Arjun Das, nephrologist, living in US.
On 14 November 2009, she married cinematographer Rajeev Ravi. The wedding took place at night in Kochi, Kerala, India.The couple have a daughter, Aradhana.

Awards

As director
International Film Festival of India
 2009 – IFFI Golden Lamp Tree Award for Best Film and Director – Kelkkunnundo  Film Chamber of Commerce
International Awards
 2017 - Global filmmaking award for story in Sundance Film Festival 2016 - Moothon
Mumbai International Film Festival
 2010 – Jury Award – Kelkkunnundo

Awards for Moothon

 2020- 3 awards at NYIFF for Best Film, Best Actor, Best Child Actor
 2020- 3 awards at NYIFF for Best Supporting Actor for Shashank Arora, Best Child Actor for Sanjana Dipu,Best Screenplay for Geetu Mohandas
 2020- 2 awards at INDO - GERMAN FILM WEEK 2020 for Audience Choice Award, Best Supporting Actor for Roshan Mathew
 2020- 2 awards at Iat NEWYORK INDIAN FILM FESTIVAL  for 4 nominations for Best Film, Best Director, Best Actor, Best Child Actor 2020
2020- won the Best Film and Jury Prize at the prestigious Festival du Film d'Asie du Sud - FFAST in Paris

Festivals for Moothon
 2020-  selected to the 18th ANNUAL IFFLA at Los Angeles, California
 2020- screened at London Indian Film Festival and Birmingham Indian Film Festival.
 2020- premiered at 43rd GOTEBORG FILM FESTIVAL 2020 In Sweden
 2020-24th edition of International Film Festival of Kerala - IFFK

Awards for Liar's Dice

 2013- National Film Award for Best Actress  Geetanjali Thapa
 2013- National Film Award for Best Cinematography  Rajeev Ravi
 2014- Sofia International Film Festival -Special Mention award & FIPRESCI AWARD for best film
 2014- New York Indian Film Festival -  Best Actress award
 2014 - Special Jury award at the 18th Sofia International Film Festival - Liar's Dice
 2014- Pesaro International Film Festival- Lino Micciche Award for the Best Film
 2014- Granada Cines del Sur Film Festival- Bronce Alhambra award

As Actress
 1986 – Film Chamber of Commerce Award for Best Child Artist – Onnu Mudal Poojyam Vare
 2004: Ala Award for Best Actress – Akale
 2002: Ala Award for Best Popular Actress – Valkannadi
 2004: Amrita Film Fraternity Award for Best Actress – Akale
 2002 – South Indian Cinematographers Association Award for Best Supporting Actress – Kannaki (film)i
 2002 – Film Critics Award for Best Actress – Shesham
 2004 – Film Critics Award for Best Actress –Akale
 2010 – Film Critics Award for Best Short Film – Kelkkunnundo
Kerala State Film Awards
2004: Kerala State Film Award for Best Actress – Akale, Oridam
1986: Kerala State Film Award for Best Child Artist – Onnu Muthal Poojyam Vare
Filmfare Awards South
2004: Filmfare Award for Best Actress – Malayalam – Akale
Asianet Film Awards 
 2004 – Special Jury Mention – Akale
Kerala Film Critics Association Awards
2001: Best Actress – Shesham
2004: Special Jury Award – Akale;
Mathrubhumi, Medimix film
2004: Best character Actress – Akale
Ramu Karyat award
2020:Most promising director -Moothon

Filmography

As an actress

As director

References

External links

Actresses from Kannur
Kerala State Film Award winners
Indian women film directors
1981 births
Living people
Actresses in Tamil cinema
Actresses in Malayalam cinema
Indian film actresses
Filmfare Awards South winners
Malayalam film directors
Film directors from Kerala
Hindi-language film directors
21st-century Indian film directors
20th-century Indian actresses
21st-century Indian actresses
Indian women screenwriters
Malayalam screenwriters
Screenwriters from Kerala
Artists from Kannur
Women artists from Kerala